jaye simpson is an Oji-Cree-Saulteaux writer from Canada, most noted as a shortlisted finalist for the Dayne Ogilvie Prize for LGBTQ Canadian writers in 2021.

simpson, who is a Two-Spirit non-binary trans woman and spells their name in lowercase letters, published their debut poetry collection it was never going to be okay in 2020. In addition to the Dayne Ogilvie Prize, the book was the winner in the poetry category for the 2021 Indigenous Voices Awards.

References

21st-century Canadian poets
21st-century First Nations writers
First Nations poets
LGBT First Nations people
Canadian LGBT poets
Non-binary poets
Two-spirit people
Living people
Transgender women
Year of birth missing (living people)
21st-century Canadian LGBT people